This list of notable people associated with Bates College includes matriculating students, alumni, attendees, faculty, trustees, and honorary degree recipients of Bates College in Lewiston, Maine. Members of the Bates community are known as "Batesies" or bobcats. This list also includes students of the affiliated Maine State Seminary, Nichols Latin School, and Cobb Divinity School. In 1915, George Colby Chase, the second president of the college, opted that the college include former students (those who did not complete the full four year course of study) as alumni in "appreciation of their loyalty". Throughout its history, Bates has been the fictional alma mater of various characters in American popular culture. Notable fictional works to feature the college include Ally McBeal (1997), The Sopranos (1999), and The Simpsons (2015). , there are 24,000 Bates College alumni. Affiliates of the college include 86 Fulbright Scholars, 22 Watson Fellows, and 5 Rhodes Scholars.  

, the college counts 12 members of the United States Congress–2 Senators and 10 members of the House of Representatives–among its alumni. In state government, Bates alumni have led all three political branches in Maine, graduating two Chief Justices of the Maine Supreme Court, two Maine Governors, and multiple leaders of both state houses. Bates has graduated 12 Olympians, with the most recent alumni competing in the 2018 Winter Olympics. More than 20 universities have been led by Bates alumni as of July 2016.

This list uses the following notation: 
 B.A. or unmarked years – recipient of Bachelor of Arts either at the Maine State Seminary or Bates
 B.S. – recipient of Bachelor of Science
 B.S.E. – recipient of Bachelor of Science in Engineering from an affiliated engineering school with Bates
 V-12 – recipient of the V-12 Degree through the college's V-12 Navy College Training Program
 S.T.B. – recipient of Sacrae Theologiae Baccalaureus from the college's defunct Cobb Divinity School, which merged with Bates' religion department in 1908

Notable graduates

Arts and letters

Literature and poetry

Journalism and nonfiction

Film and television

Music

Art, architecture, and design

Government

 Note: alumni who have served in multiple political offices are noted in all relevant sections respective to their position at the time for continuity

U.S. Cabinet-ranked officials 
Although Bates alumni have served in a variety of capacities in American federal government, namely in executive departments and agencies, the following have served in Cabinet-level positions, advising the executive branch of the United States in one form or another. Other alumni–serving in secondary federal capacities–are catalogued in the succeeding section.

Federal officials and ambassadors 
The following catalogues notable officials or ambassadors in American federal government, typically in the executive, judicial, and legislative branches. Alumni who have served in leadership roles in federal government or in Cabinet-level positions are documented in the preceding section; members of the U.S. Congress (along with state government officials) are noted in the succeeding sections.

U.S. Senators 
From 1965 to 1968, both Edmund Muskie (1936) and Robert F. Kennedy (1944) served together in the United States Senate, representing Maine and New York, respectively. Many of the following alumni served in leadership positions within the Senate.

U.S. Representatives
The first Bates alumni to serve in the United States Congress was John Swasey (1859) in the 60th United States Congress. During the 73rd and 116th U.S. Congresses, four Bates alumni served simultaneously–Carroll Beedy (1903) and Charles Clason (1911) during the former sitting with Ben Cline (1994) and Jared Golden (2011) during the latter. Approximately 45% of alumni elected to the U.S. House of Representatives have done so in pairs. Many of the following alumni served in leadership positions within the House of Representatives.

Governors

State officials and cabinet-ranked officials 
The following alumni have served in U.S. state governments, typically in the state judiciary and executive cabinet. Many of the alumni also served in additional leadership roles within state government.

State Senators
Many of the following alumni served in leadership positions within their respective state's upper house, including president of the senate, majority leader, minority leader, as well as minority and majority whip.

State Representatives
Many of the following alumni served in leadership positions within their respective state's lower house, including speaker of the house, majority leader, minority leader, as well as minority and majority whip.

Mayors 
There have been six Bates alumni to serve as the Mayor of Lewiston, Maine, the hometown of the college. The smallest city to be governed by a Bates alumni is Gardiner, Maine, while the largest is San Francisco, California. John Jenkins ('74) is the only alumni to serve as mayor to two different cities (Lewiston and Auburn, Maine).

Royalty

Law and legal studies

Federal and state judges 
The following section documents Bates alumni who have served in both the federal judiciary of the United States (including the U.S. district court system) and state judiciaries. Alumni who have served in executive positions, such as attorneys general (both on a state and federal level) are noted in the "federal officials and ambassadors" section above.

State Supreme Court Justices
All Bates alumni who have gone to serve on a state supreme court have done so in the Maine supreme court system. There have been two chief justices and seven associate justices.

Legal academics and other legal figures
Alumni who have served in political or judicial offices are noted above. The following catalogues notable alumni who have contributed to legal studies, the law, or maintained notability in academia.

Academia and administration

University founders and presidents

Professors and scholars

Athletics 
During the 1912 Summer Olympics there were two Bates alumni competing in the sporting event, both representing the United States in baseball exhibitions. Nancy Ingersoll Fiddler ('78) and Andrew Byrnes ('05) are the only two alumni to compete in two Olympic Games, competing in two successive winter and summer olympics, respectively. Byrnes is the only Bates alumni to medal at the Olympic Games, winning a Gold Medal rowing for Canada during the 2008 Summer Olympics.

Business

Religion

Science

Military

Fictional people

Notable faculty 

Sociology

Modern languages

Religious studies

Economics

English

Debate

Political science

Philosophy 

History

Visual art

Theater

Music

Anthropology

Presidents of Bates College

Commencement speakers and honorary recipients
The following lists notable people who have spoken at a Bates College commencement ceremony or received an honorary degree. Those who are counted as alumni of the college and have received honorary degrees (or spoken at commencements) are noted in the preceding sections.

See also
List of Bowdoin College people
List of Colby College people
List of Dartmouth College people
History of Bates College

References

Further reading

Alfred, Williams Anthony. Bates College and Its Background. (1936) Online Deposit.
Stuan, Thomas. The Architecture of Bates College. (2006)
Chase, Harry. Bates College was named after Mansfield Man. (1878)
Woz, Markus. Bates College – Traditionally Unconventional. (2002)
Bates College Archives. Bates College Catalog. (1956–2017).  2017 Catalog.
Bates College Archives. Maine State Seminary Records. Online Deposit.
Bates College Archives. Bates College Oral History Project. Online Deposit.
Clark, Charles E. Bates Through the Years: an Illustrated History. (2005) 
Smith, Dana. Bates College – U. S. Navy V-12 Program Collection. (1943) Online Deposit.
Eaton, Mabel. General Catalogue of Bates College and Cobb Divinity School. (1930)
Larson, Timothy. Faith by Their Works: The Progressive Tradition at Bates College. (2005)
Calhoun, Charles C. A Small College in Maine. p. 163. (1993)
Johnnett, R. F. Bates Student: A Monthly Magazine. (1878)
Phillips, F. Charles Bates College in Maine: Enduring Strength and Scholarship. Issue 245. (1952)
Dormin J. Ettrude, Edith M. Phelps, Julia Emily Johnsen. French Occupation of the Ruhr: Bates College Versus Oxford Union Society of Oxford College. (1923)
The Bates Student. The Voice of Bates College. (1873–2017)
Emeline Cheney; Burlingame, Aldrich. The story of the life and work of Oren Burbank Cheney, founder and first president of Bates College. (1907) Online Version.

External links
Bates College Alumni Serving in the Civil War (1863)
Student List from 1857 on LittleIvies.com
Student List from 1858 on LittleIvies.com

Bates College people